EuroGIX is a network service provider located in Alsace, France that acts as a backbone between Internet exchange points (IXPs). They use the term GIX to refer to their role in connecting IXPs.

See also 
 List of Internet exchange points

External links
EuroGIX web site

Internet exchange points in France
Internet in France